Lutheria is a genus of plants in the family Bromeliaceae.

Species
Species include:
 Lutheria bi-beatricis (Morillo) Barfuss & W.Till
 Lutheria glutinosa (Lindl.) Barfuss & W.Till
 Lutheria soderstromii (L.B.Sm.) Barfuss & W.Till
 Lutheria splendens (Brongn.) Barfuss & W.Till

References

Bromeliaceae genera
Epiphytes
Tillandsioideae